Orange emperor may refer to:

 Anax speratus, a dragonfly species
 Charaxes latona, a butterfly species

Animal common name disambiguation pages